Sergio Armando Rada Rodriguez (born January 27, 1984) is a Colombian weightlifter. His personal best is 257 kg (2007). He was born in Campo de la Cruz, Department of Atlántico.

At the 2005 World Championships he ranked 9th in the 56 kg category, with a total of 253 kg.
At the 2006 World Championships he ranked 11th in the 56 kg category, with a total of 256 kg.

At the 2006 South American Championships he won gold in the 56 kg category, with a total of 255 kg.

He competed in Weightlifting at the 2008 Summer Olympics in the 56 kg division finishing twelfth with 252 kg.

He is 5 ft 4 inches tall and weighs 123 lb.

Notes and references

External links
 NBC profile
 Athlete Biography at beijing2008

Colombian male weightlifters
1984 births
Living people
Weightlifters at the 2008 Summer Olympics
Weightlifters at the 2012 Summer Olympics
Olympic weightlifters of Colombia
People from Atlántico Department
Weightlifters at the 2011 Pan American Games
Pan American Games medalists in weightlifting
Pan American Games silver medalists for Colombia
South American Games gold medalists for Colombia
South American Games medalists in weightlifting
Competitors at the 2010 South American Games
Medalists at the 2011 Pan American Games
20th-century Colombian people
21st-century Colombian people